Cheruvu Kommu Palem is a village in Darsi mandal, Prakasam district, of the Indian state of Andhra Pradesh.

Demographics 
In the 2011 census, Cheruvu Kommu Palem had a population of 1,188 inhabitants, with 613 males and 575 females living in 279 households. Telugu is the official language, but Urdu is also spoken by large numbers of inhabitants.

References

Villages in Prakasam district